Letty, Lettie, Letti or Lety as a female given name is a shortening of Leticia (and its variants), Violet or Colette.  It may refer to:

People

Given name
Letty Alonzo, Filipina actress
Letty Aronson, film producer
Lettie S. Bigelow, American author
Letty Eisenhauer, American pop artist and Fluxus performer
Letty Lade, wife of John Lade (1759-1838), a prominent member of Regency English society
Letty Lind, English actress
Letty Cottin Pogrebin, American writer and journalist
Letty M. Russell, the 1986 Warfield lecturer
Lettie, English musician
Lettie Pate Whitehead Evans, American businesswoman and philanthropist
Lettie Hamlet Rogers, American writer

Surname
Cythna Letty, South African botanical artist

Nickname or pseudonym
Leticia Murray, Mexican model
Lettie Viljoen, pseudonym of South African writer Ingrid Winterbach

In fiction
Letty, a character in the 1928 film The Wind, played by Lillian Gish
Letty Ortiz, a character in the 2001 film The Fast and the Furious
Letty, a character in the 1977 novel Quartet in Autumn
Letty Ketterley, a character in The Chronicles of Narnia series
Letty, a character in the play Da Kink in My Hair and the Canadian TV series of the same name
Letty, a 1980 novel by American writer Clare Darcy
Letty, a character in the 1917 musical Maytime
Letty, a character in the 1919 film Gun Law
Letty Bell, a character in the radio and TV series Little Britain
Letty Carrington, a character in the 1915 film The Lily and the Rose
Letty Edwards, a character in the 1990s British TV series Games World
the title character of Letty Fox: Her Luck, a novel by Australian writer Christina Stead
Letty Gaunt, a character in the 1970s TV series The Onedin Line
Dr. Letty Jordan, a character in the 2000s American TV series Presidio Med
the title character of Letty Lynton a 1932 film
Lettie Lutz, a character in the 2017 film The Greatest Showman
Letty Pace, a character in the 1933 film Jennie Gerhardt, played by Mary Astor
Letty Whiterock, a fictional character in Touhou Project games
Lety, a character in La Fea Más Bella, a Mexican telenovela (soap opera)
Lettie Hatter, a character in Howl's Moving Castle, a novel by Diana Wynne Jones

See also

Laetitia (given name)
Leticia (disambiguation)
Letitia
Lotty

Feminine given names